Savoia di Lucania is a town and comune in the province of Potenza, in the Southern Italian region of Basilicata. As of 2011 its population was of 1,148.

History
The original name of the village was Salvia di Lucania (also simply Salvia), referring to the sage plant (Salvia officinalis). It was altered at the end of the 19th century to Savoia di Lucania after a local resident and anarchist, Giovanni Passannante, attempted to kill King Umberto I of Italy on November 17, 1878.

In the early 2000s it was proposed to return to the original toponym, removing the references to the House of Savoy. Two committees have been constituted, one for the return to the toponym of Salvia, and another for the maintenance of the current name.

Geography
Located near the borders with Campania, Savoia is bounded by the comuni of Caggiano (SA), Picerno, Sant'Angelo Le Fratte, Satriano di Lucania, Tito, and Vietri di Potenza. It counts the hamlets (frazioni) of Castellaro, Fossati, and Perolla.

People
Michele Gerardo Pasquarelli (1868-1924), anthropologist
Giovanni Passannante (1849-1910), anarchist

References

External links

 Official website 

Cities and towns in Basilicata